The National Confederation of Cooperatives (NATCCO) is the largest cooperative federation in the Philippines  with 760 member cooperatives and Non-governmental Organizations NGO in 77 Provinces and 130 Cities and Municipalities as of June 2015.

History 
The National Confederation of Cooperatives (NATCCO) was organized by credit union pioneers in the Philippines who believed that the task of co-op development lies primarily in the hands of the private sector. As early as the 1950s to 70s, co-op sector leaders were aware that in order to succeed they could not rely on government alone. Instead, co-ops have to be driven and patronized by their members and it is only through co-op education that this level of member patronage and responsibility can be established.

In the 1950s to 70s, a large number of primary co-operatives formed five regional co-op training centers (secondary cooperatives). In 1977, the five regional training centers formed NATCCO, then known as the National Association of Training Centers for Co-operatives, to coordinate the training and educational services for cooperatives at the national level. NATCCO also served as the voice of co-ops in the country.

In response to the growing needs of primary co-op affiliates, in 1986 NATCCO was transformed into a multi-service national co-op federation while the regional training centers were transformed into multi-service co-op development centers. The acronym NATCCO was retained and its meaning converted to the present, National Confederation of Cooperatives.

Members 

 (MASS-SPECC) Mindanao Alliance Self-help Societies-Southern Philippines Educational Cooperative Center
 4HG (For His Glory) Multipurpose Cooperative
 4k Marketing Cooperative
 Abra Diocesan Teachers and Employees Multi-Purpose Cooperative (ADTEMPCO)
 Abra Farmers and Provincial Employees Multipurpose Cooperative (AFPEMCO)
 Abrasa Multi-Purpose Cooperative
 Abreco Employees Multipurpose Cooperative (ABREMPCO)
 ABS-CBN Rank & File Employees Multi-Purpose Cooperative (ARFEMC)
 Abulog Teachers & Employees Multi-purpose Cooperative
 Abuyog St. Francis Xavier Credit Cooperative (AFCCO)
 ACDI Multi-Purpose Cooperative (ACDI)
 Agdao Multi-Purpose Cooperative
 Agra Progreso Multipurpose Cooperative
 Agrarian Reform Beneficiaries & Developers Multi-Purpose Cooperative (ARBD MPCO)
 Agricultural Community Credit Cooperative
 Agricultural Development Workers & Employees Multi-Purpose Cooperative (ADWEMPC)
 Agrizkaya Cooperative Federation
 Aguinaldo Pomhochan Multi-Purpose Cooperative
 Aguipo Coconut Farmers Multi-Purpose Cooperative
 Agusan del Norte Teachers, Retirees, Employees and Community Cooperative (ANTRECCO)
 Alaminos Credit Cooperative
 Alang sa Tanan Multi-purpose cooperative
 Alejandro Go Beltran (AGB) Foundation
 Alfonso Lista Development Cooperative
 Alicia Local Government Employees Cooperative
 Alicia Neighborhood and Municipal Employee Livelihood MPC (ANMELCO)
 Alilem Multi-Purpose Cooperative
 Alilem Samahang Nayon Tribal Multipurpose Cooperative
 Alima Credit Cooperative
 Alipao Multi-Purpose Cooperative (ALMUCO)
 AL-ISLAH People's Economic Multipurpose Cooperative (Al-Islah)
 Almeria Seafarers Multi-purpose Cooperative
 Amcha Multipurpose Cooperative
 Angat Development & Credit Cooperative
 Angono Credit and Development Coop (ACDECO)
 Antique Provincial Gov't Employees MPC
 Apalit Small Christian Communities Multipurpose Cooperative  (ASCCOM)
 Apo Macote Primary Multi Purpose Cooperative
 Apung Monica de Minalin Multi-Purpose Cooperative
 Arya Coconut Farmers Multi-Purpose Cooperative
 Asensado Savings & Credit Cooperative
 Asiapro Multi-Purpose Cooperative
 ASKI Multi-Purpose Cooperative
 Asosasyon sa Nagkahiusang Lumulupyo sa San Roque (ANALUMBRO) MPC
 Aurora Integrated Multi-Purpose Cooperative
 Baao Parish Multi-Purpose Cooperative
 Bacarra Savings and Credit Cooperative
 Bacayan Multi-Purpose Cooperative
 Bacbacan Multi-Purpose Cooperative
 Baclay Multi-Purpose Cooperative
 Bacolod City Credit Cooperative (BACCCoop)
 Bafaventra Multi-Purpose Cooperative (BMPC)
 Baggak ti Daya Development Cooperative
 Bagong Silang 2 Multi-Purpose Cooperative
 Baguio Entrepreneurs Credit Cooperative (BEC Co-op)
 Bahong Multipurpose Cooperative
 Balamban Community Multi-purpose Cooperative
 Balay Mindanaw Foundation Inc.
 Balugo Farmers Multi-Purpose Cooperative (BFMPC)
 Bambang Grains, Fruits And Vegetable Growers Multi-Purpose Cooperative
 Bangon Yanong Igsoon Haligi ka sa Nasod (Bohol BAYANIHAN) Multi-Purpose Cooperative
 Bansalan Cooperative Society (BCS Credit Cooperative)
 Bantolinao Farmers Multipurpose Cooperative
 Barbaza Multipurpose Cooperative
 Barcelona Development Cooperative
 Barcelona Water Service Development Cooperative
 Barotac Nuevo Development Cooperative
 Basak-Layog Agricultural Multi-Purpose Cooperative (BLAMCI)
 Basey I District Multipurpose Cooperative
 Batong Paloway Producers Cooperative
 Batu Farmers Multipurpose Cooperative
 Bauan Doctors Multi-Purpose Cooperative
 Bauangeños Credit Cooperative
 Baug CARP Beneficiaries Multipurpose Cooperative
 Bayanihan Hundred Islands Agrarian Reform Cooperative
 Bayanihan Multipurpose Cooperative
 Bayawan Community Cooperative
 Bayawan Multi-Purpose Agricultural Kilusang Bayan
 Belison Multi-Purpose Cooperative
 Benabaye Multipurpose Cooperative
 Benguet State University Multipurpose Cooperative (BSU MPC)
 Biatungan Multipurpose Cooperative
 Bicol Federation of Dairy Cooperative (BFDC)
 Bicol Parole and Probation Administration Employees Credit Cooperative
 Bicol Transport Service Cooperative Federation (BITSCOFED)
 Big Daddy Credit Cooperative
 Bigay Buhay MPC (BBMC)
 Binalbagan Multi-Purpose Cooperative
 Binangonan Development Cooperative (BIDECO)
 Biocare Multipurpose Cooperative
 Birhen ng Bayan ng San Mateo Multipurpose Cooperative
 Bislig City Gov't Employees Multipurpose Cooperative
 Bohol Community Multi-Purpose Cooperative
 Bohol DAR Employees Multi-purpose Cooperative (BODARE MPC)
 Bohol Diocesan Multi-Purpose Cooperative
 Bohol Vendors Multipurpose Cooperative (BOVEMCO)
 Bol-anon Savings and Credit Cooperative (BOSCCO)
 Bonbonon Farmers Multipurpose Cooperative (BOFARMPUCO)
 Bontoc Multipurpose Cooperative
 Boracay Land Transport Multipurpose Cooperative
 Buenavista Development Cooperative
 Bugasong Multipurpose Cooperative
 Buhi Rural Waterworks and Sanitation Multipurpose Cooperative
 Bukas Palad Multipurpose Cooperative
 Bukidnon Development Multipurpose Cooperative
 Bukidnon Government Employees Multipurpose Cooperative (BUGEMCO)
 Bukidnon Integrated Planters Multipurpose Cooperative (BIP MPC)
 Bukidnon Transport Multi-Purpose Cooperative (BUKTRAMCO)
 Buklod Multipurpose Cooperative
 Buklod ng Buhay Savings and Credit Cooperative (BBSCC)
 Buklod Unlad Multipurpose Cooperative
 Bukluran Multipurpose Cooperative
 Bulacan Federation of Cooperatives
 Bureau of Jail Management & Penology Multi-Purpose Cooperative (BJMP-MPC)
 Butuan Habitat Development Cooperative
 Cabatuan Immanuel Multi-Purpose Cooperative
 Cabucgayan Development Cooperative
 Cadalian Dairy Farmers Cooperative (CADAFCO)
 Cadiz City Credit Cooperative (C4)
 Cagayan Valley Dev't Coop, Inc. (CAVADECO, INC.)
 Calapan Labor Service Development cooperative (CALSEDECO)
 Calapan Vendors Multi-Purpose Cooperative
 Calindagan Multipurpose Cooperative
 Camalig (Albay) Credit Cooperative
 Camarines Norte Business Dev't Coop (CANDEVCO) (formerly CANBUDECO)
 Camarines Norte Local Resources Management Cooperative (CNLRM Coop)
 Camarines Norte State College Multi-Purpose Cooperative
 Campangga Alayon Multi-Purpose Cooperative (CAMPCO)
 CamSur Multi-Purpose Cooperative (Formerly: Capitol Multi-Purpose Cooperative)
 Candijay Teachers and Community Multi-Purpose Cooperative
 Caniogan Credit & Development Cooperative
 Capitol Employees of Bataan MPC
 Capiz Settler's Cooperative Rural Bank Inc.
 Carangian Fisherfolks and Farmers Development Cooperative
 Care Filipinos Multi-Purpose Cooperative (CFMPC)
 Carmen Multi-Purpose Cooperative
 Casandro Multipurpose Cooperative
 Casay Credit Cooperative
 Casig-Ang San Miguel Development Cooperative
 CASURECO II Employees Multi-Purpose Cooperative
 Catanauan Credit & Development Cooperative
 Catanduanes State College Multi-Purpose Cooperative
 Catholic Servants of Christ Community Multipurpose Cooperative
 Catmon Community Multi-Purpose Cooperative
 Catubig Multipurpose Cooperative (formerly PRMAC Multipurpose Cooperative)
 Cavite Farmers Feedmilling & Marketing Cooperative (CAFFMACO)
 CDUH Employees Multi-Purpose Cooperative (Cebu Doctors University Hospital)
 Cebu Federation of Dairy Cooperatives
 Cebu Market Vendors Multi-Purpose Cooperative (CEMVEDCO)
 Cebu Mitsumi Multi-purpose Cooperative
 Cebu News Workers Multipurpose Cooperative
 Cebu Peoples' Multi-Purpose Cooperative
 Cebu Tour Guides Multi-Purpose Cooperative
 Center for Assistance of Rural Entrepreneurs, Asso. Multipurpose Cooperative
 Center for Community Transformation Credit Cooperative
 Central Visayas Plant Nursery Multipurpose Cooperative
 Chevra Koinonia Credit Cooperative
 Christian Farmers Multi-Purpose Cooperative
 Claveria Agri-based Multi-Purpose Cooperative
 Claveria Grassroots Multi-Purpose Cooperative
 Coliling Farmers’ Savings and Credit Cooperative
 Comelec Employees Development Cooperative
 Community Water and Sanitation Service Cooperative (COWASSCO)
 Compostela Market Vendors Multipurpose Cooperative (COMAVEMCO)
 Consolacion Multi-Purpose Cooperative
 Coolway Multi-Purpose Cooperative (CMPC)
 COOP FUNERAL CARE- Antique
 Cooperative Bank of Agusan Del Sur
 Cooperative Bank of Agusan Norte-Butuan City
 Cooperative Bank of Camarines Norte
 Cooperative Bank of Leyte
 Cooperative of Agrarian Reform Employees  (CARE)
 Cooperative Union of Iligan City
 Coop-Life Mutual Benefit Services Association (CLIMBS)
 Cordova Catholic Cooperative School
 Cordova Multi-Purpose Cooperative
 CVSCAFT Bilar Multi-Purpose Cooperative
 D.A. II Multi-Purpose Cooperative (D.A.R02 MPC)
 Dacutan Farmers Multipurpose Cooperative (DAFAMCO)
 Dagohoy Multi-Purpose Cooperative
 Dalawinon Multi-Purpose Farmers Cooperative (DMFC)
 Danao Employees Multi-Purpose Cooperative
 Danlugan Farmers Multi-Purpose Cooperative (DFMPC)
 Dao Multi-purpose Cooperative
 DAPCO Agrarian Reform Beneficiaries Cooperative (DARBCO)
 DAR Multipurpose Cooperative (DARMPC)
 Davao de Oro Credit Cooperative
 De La Salle Lipa Multi-Purpose Cooperative
 Del Rosario Multi-Purpose Cooperative
 DENR Multipurpose Cooperative
 DENRACEAE Multipurpose Cooperative
 Diamond MultiLine Cooperative
 Diffun Saranay and Development Cooperative
 Digos Market Vendors Multipurpose Cooperative
 Dinalupihan Economic Community Multipurpose Cooperative
 Dingle Government Workers Development Cooperative
 Divine Providence Multipurpose Cooperative
 Divine Word College of Legazpi Multi-Purpose Cooperative (DWCL MPC)
 DMPI Employees Agrarian Reform Benefeciaries Cooperative (DEARBC)
 Don Bosco Network Multi-Purpose Cooperative
 Don Emilio del Valle Memorial Hospital Employees Multipurpose Cooperative
 Dumangas Agrarian Reform Cooperative (DARC)
 Dumanjug Multi-Purpose Cooperative
 Dumper Transport Cooperative
 Dur-as Savings and Credit Cooperative
 Eastern Telecoms Credit Cooperative
 Eastern Visayas Cooperative Federation
 Eastern Visayas Microcredit and Multi-Service Cooperative
 Echo MultiPurpose Cooperative
 El Grande Multi-Purpose Cooperative
 Emmanuel Multi-purpose Cooperative
 Epiphany Multi-Purpose Cooperative (EMPC)
 Esperanza Multi-purpose Cooperative
 Excellent People's Multi-Purpose Cooperative
 Fairchild Cebu Community Credit Cooperative, Inc. (F4C)
 Fairdeal Multipurpose Cooperative
 Family of Light Producer's Cooperative
 Fast Mover Multi Purpose Cooperative
 Fatima Multipurpose Cooperative (Leyte)
 Fatima Multi-Purpose Cooperative (Vigan)
 Federation of Cooperatives in Mindanao (FEDCO)
 Federation of Davao Dairy Farmers Cooperatives (FEDDAFC)
 Financial Transformation Center Credit Cooperative
 First Consolidated Cooperative Along Tañon Seabords (FCCT)
 Five Star Savings Credit Development Cooperative
 Fonus Cebu Federation of Cooperatives
 Fonus Cooperative
 Fonus Federation of Cooperatives in Socsksargen
 Foundation for Agrarian Reform Cooperatives in Mindanao, Inc. (FARMCOOP)
 Gabay sa Kalamboan Microfinance Cooperative
 Ganano Communal Irrigators Multi-Purpose Cooperative
 Gardenia Kapitbisig Multi-Purpose and Transport Services Cooperative
 Gasan Vendors Multipurpose Cooperative
 Gata Daku Multi-Purpose Cooperative (GDMPC)
 General Mariano Alvarez Services Cooperative (GEMASCO)
 General Mariano Alvarez Transport Service & Multi-purpose Cooperative
 Giporlos Credit Cooperative
 Global Skills Providers MPC (GLOBALPRO)
 GMA Multipurpose Cooperative
 GMA Vendors Development Cooperative
 GMA_Muslim Christian Alliance Traders Savings & Credit Cooperative
 GMA-7 Employees Multipurpose Cooperative
 GMAT Multipurpose & Transport Service Cooperative
 Good Samaritan Multi-purpose Cooperative
 Government Employees Multi-Purpose Cooperative of Alcoy (GEMCA)
 Government of Laoag Employees Development Cooperative (GLEDCO)
 GP - 125 Golden Pance Irrigators Service Cooperative
 Greater Midsayap Multi-Purpose Cooperative
 Greeners Credit Cooperative
 Gubat St. Anthony Cooperative (GSAC)
 Guimaras Brethren Multi-Purpose Cooperative (GBMPC)
 Guimaras Multi-purpose Cooperative
 Guimaras OFWs Multi-Purpose Cooperative  (GOFWS-MPC)
 Guimbal Development Cooperative (GUIDECO)
 Hamtic Multi-purpose cooperative
 Hatdannay Multipurpose Cooperative
 Highlander Agrarian Reform Beneficiaries MPC (HARBEMCO)
 Hijo Employees’ Agrarian Reform Beneficiaries’ Cooperative-2 (HEARBCO-2)
 Hilltop Mansion Multipurpose Cooperative
 Hilongos Multi-Purpose Cooperative
 Hojap Multi-Purpose Cooperative
 HOLCIM Multi-Purpose Cooperative
 Holy Child Multi-Purpose Cooperative
 House of Representatives Multi-Purpose Cooperative
 Ibabao Multi-purpose Cooperative
 IDEA Multi-Purpose Cooperative
 Ifugao Global Entrepreneurs Multi-Purpose Cooperative
 Igcocolo Primary Multi-Purpose Cooperative
 Iligan Cement Multi-Purpose Cooperative
 Iligan Dealers Multi-purpose Cooperative
 Iligan Light Employees Multi-Purpose Cooperative (ILEMPCO)
 Ilocos Sur Upland Developer's Cooperative
 Iloilo City Public School Teachers and Employees Multi-Purpose Cooperative (ICPSTEMPC)
 Iloilo Provincial Employees and Community Multi-Purpose Cooperative (IPECMPC)
 IMCO Multi-Purpose Cooperative
 Imelda Mun'l Employees & Entrepreneur Multi-Purpose Cooperative (IEEMCO)
 Immaculate Conception Parish Development Cooperative
 Immaculate Heart of Mary Multipurpose Cooperative
 Immanuel Partners Multipurpose Cooperative (IPAMCO)
 Impasugong Samahang Nayon Multi-Purpose Cooperative
 Imus Vendors Development Cooperative
 Indanan Municipal Employees Multi-purpose Cooperative
 Infanta Credit and Development Cooperative
 Inner City Development Cooperative
 Ipil Consumers Multi-Purpose Cooperative
 Irosin Market Vendors and Farmers Development Cooperative
 Isabel Bay Multipurpose Cooperative
 Isabela Community Multi-Purpose Cooperative
 Iwahori Multi-Purpose Cooperative
 Jobnet Service Cooperative
 Jobs 4 All Multipurpose Cooperative
 Jollibee Foods Corporation Employees Multi-Purpose Cooperative
 Jose Panganiban Primary Hospital Service Cooperative
 Judean Multi-Purpose Cooperative
 Kabalikat Multi-purpose Cooperative
 Kabalikat Para sa Diyos at Bayan Multi-Purpose Cooperative (KADBAYAN MPC)
 Kabalikat sa Kaunlaran Service Cooperative (KASAKA SERVICE COOP)
 Kabangasan-Mapua-Dahilig ARC Coop (KAMADA ARC COOP)
 Kabankalan Government Employees Multi-Purpose Cooperative
 Kabisig Multi-Purpose & Transport Service Cooperative
 Kahugpungan sa mga Igsoong Naglawig sa Kalamboan
 Kakuyo Multi-purpose Cooperative
 Kalikasan Multipurpose Cooperative
 Kamanepla Multipurpose Cooperative
 Kangara Multipurpose Cooperative
 Kapatiran MultiPurpose Cooperative
 Kasarinlan Development Cooperative
 Kasibu Farmers and Development Cooperative
 Kasilak Multipurpose Cooperative
 Katilingbanong Programa sa Maayong Panglawas-Kinaugalingong Paningkamot Multi-Purpose Cooperative (KPMP-KPMPC)
 Kaunlad Multi-Purpose Cooperative
 Kaunlaran Sa Kanayunan Credit Cooperative (KASAKA)
 Kauswagan Agrarian Reform Benefeciaries Multi-Purpose Cooperative (KARBEMPCO)
 Kauyagan Savers Cooperative
 Kawasan Nature Park Multi-purpose Cooperative
 KFI Center for Community Development
 Kiamba Municipal Employees Cooperative
 Kiangan Community Multipurpose & Development Cooperative
 Kisandal Savings and Credit Cooperative (KSCC)
 Kitanglad Multi-purpose Cooperative
 Kooperatiba Naton
 Kooperatiba ng Nagkakaisang Mamamayan sa Lalawigan ng Quezon Multi-Purpose Cooperative (KOOPNAMAN MPC)
 Kooperatiba ng Sambayanan ng Banal na Krus (KSBanK)
 Kooperatiba Para sa Kaunlaran ng Lagonoy (KKL)
 Kooperatibang Likas ng Nueva Ecija
 La Castellana 1 Personnel MPC (LC1PMPC)
 La Libertad Agrarian Reform Beneficiaries Multipurpose Cooperative - LARBECO (formerly-LAMPCO)
 La Libertad Women's Balikatan Multipurpose Cooperative
 La Trinidad Vegetables Trading Post MultiPurpose Cooperative
 La Union Ladies Multi-Purpose Cooperative
 Labo Progressive Multipurpose Cooperative
 Lagawe Multipurpose Development Cooperative
 Laguan Multi-purpose cooperative
 Lahing Pilipino Multipurpose and Transport Service Cooperative
 Lamac Multi-Purpose Cooperative
 Lambunao Government Employees Multi-Purpose Cooperative
 Lamitan Agrarian Reform Beneficiaries Cooperative
 Lamut Grass Roots Savings and Development Cooperative (LAGSADECO)
 Lanang Multipurpose Cooperative
 Landbank Employees Credit Cooperative (LBECC)
 Lapuyan Multi-Purpose Cooperative
 Laua-an Multipurpose Cooperative
 LCC-Daet MPCI
 LCC-Iriga MPCI
 LCC-K MPCI
 Leganes Community Development Program Multi-Purpose Cooperative (LCDP-MPC)
 Legazpi City Government Employees Welfare Association Multi-Purpose Cooperative
 Leon Small Coconut Farmers Multipurpose Cooperative (LESCOFAMPCO)
 Libagon Area MPC
 Libmanan Community Development Cooperative
 Libungan National Employees Multi-Purpose Cooperative
 Lico Agrarian Reform Beneficiaries Multi-Purpose Cooperative (LICARB MPC)
 Lide Employees Development Cooperative
 Lifegiver Multipurpose Cooperative
 Ligas Kooperatibang Bayan Sa Pagpapaunlad
 Limbahan Small Coconut Farmers and Women Multi-Purpose Cooperative (LIMSCOFARMCO)
 Lingayen Catholic Credit Cooperative (LCCC)
 Lodlod Multi-Purpose Cooperative
 Lorenzo Tan Multi-Purpose Cooperative (LTMPC)
 Lourdes Multi-purpose Cooperative (formerly Lourdes Women Multi-purpose Cooperative)
 Lucena Retailers Multi-Purpose Cooperative
 Lupi Multi-Purpose Cooperative
 Ma. Aurora Tree Farmers Multipurpose Cooperative
 Maasin Community Multipurpose Cooperative (MCCI)
 Maasin Employees Multipurpose Cooperative
 Macario Primary Multipurpose Cooperative
 Maco Development Cooperative (MADECO)
 Maddela Auto Savings Multi-Purpose Cooperative
 Maddela Integrated Farmers Savings Development Cooperative
 Magarao Multi-Purpose Cooperative
 Magsaysay Farmers Multi-Purpose Cooperative
 Malabing Valley Multi-Purpose Cooperative
 Malabon Central Market Dev't Cooperative
 Malambuon Multi Purpose Cooperative
 Malapatan Multi Purpose Cooperative
 Maliliit na Sambayanang Simbahan Diocesan Multipurpose Cooperative (MSSD MPC)
 Mambajao Credit Cooperative
 Mandaluyong High School Multi-Purpose Cooperative
 Mandaue City Market Vendors Multi-Purpose Cooperative (MAVENCO)
 Manggagawa Ni San Jose Multi-Purpose Cooperative (MSJMPC)
 Manguyang Agrarian Reform Beneficiaries Cooperative (MARBECO)
 Mansalay Agriculture and Fisheries Development Cooperative
 Mantacida United Farmers Multi -Purpose Cooperative
 Maramag Community Multi-Purpose Cooperative
 Maranding Women Investors Multi-Purpose Cooperative
 Maria Aurora Development Cooperative (MADECO)
 Marinduque Social Action Multipurpose Cooperative (MASAMCO)
 Maripipi Multi-Purpose Cooperative (MMPC)
 Maritime Multi-Purpose Cooperative (MMPC)
 Mariveles Women's Multipurpose Cooperative (MWMPC)
 Mary Immaculate Concepcion Multi-Purpose Cooperative
 Masbate Multi-Purpose Cooperative (MMPC)
 Masisit-Dacal Livelihood Cooperative (MASCOOP)
 Maydolong Development Multipurpose Cooperative
 Maymatan Farmers Multi-Purpose Cooperative
 Mediatrix Multi-Purpose Cooperative
 Mega Realm Housing Cooperative
 Mehitabel Employees Multipurpose Cooperative
 Mérida Agricultural Development Services Multi-purpose Cooperative
 Metro Ormoc Community Cooperative (OCCI)
 Metro Paypayad Multi-Purpose Cooperative
 Metropolitan Naga Water District Employees Multi-Purpose Cooperative (MWDEMPC)
 Micro-Entrepreneurs Multi-Purpose Cooperative
 Midsalip Farmers Multi-Purpose Cooperative
 Minaba Multi-Purpose Cooperative
 Mindanao Coalition of Development NGO Networks (MINCODE)
 Mindanao Savings Cooperative (MINSAVE)
 Mindanao State University-Iligan Institute of Technology Multi-Purpose Cooperative (MSU-IIT MPC)
 Mindoro Progressive Multi-Purpose Cooperative
 Mo. Bonifacia Workers Credit Coop.
 Moncada Women's Credit Cooperative (MWCC)
 Morong Kabalikat Multi-Purpose Cooperative
 Mother Rita Multi-Purpose Cooperative (MORIMC)
 MSU-Sulu Multi-purpose Cooperative
 Multi-Agri-Forest and Community Development Cooperative
 Municipal Employees of Tigaon Development Cooperative
 Murphy Development Cooperative
 N.E. Association of Persons with Disability Primary Multipurpose Cooperative
 Nabua Development Multipurpose Cooperative
 Nagkahiusang Mag-uuma Sa Guinhalinan Cooperative (NAGMASAGUICO)
 Nagkakaisang Lakas Multi-Purpose Cooperative
 NAGKASAMA Multi-Purpose Cooperative
 Nam-ay Ti Umili, Inc.
 Namria Multi-Purpose Cooperative (NMPC)
 Nasugbu Municipal Employees Multi-Purpose Cooperative (NHEMPC)
 National Federation of Cooperatives of Persons With Disability
 National Savings & Homes Cooperative
 National Teachers & Employees Coop bank
 Naval Community Credit Cooperative
 NEC Multipurpose Cooperative (NEC Financial)
 New Galerian Businessmen's Credit Cooperative
 New Jireh Pharmacy, Distributor and Multi-purpose cooperative
 News Multipurpose Cooperative
 Next Level Training and Advocacy Cooperative
 NGPI-ARB Multi-Purpose Cooperative (NGPI-ARB MPC)
 Norkis Credit Cooperative
 North South Alliance Multi-Purpose Cooperative (NOSAMCO)
 Northern Bukidnon Transport Service Cooperative (NOBTSCO)
 Northern Quezon Parents-Teachers Multi-purpose Cooperative
 Northern Quezon Savings and Credit Cooperative (NORQUESAC)
 Northern Samar Development Workers Community Cooperative (NSDWCC)
 Notre Dame of Jolo Multi-Purpose Cooperative (ND Jolo- MPC)
 Notre Dame of Marbel University Employees Development Cooperative (NDMU COOP)
 Novaliches Development Cooperative (NOVADECI)
 Nueva Era Multi-Purpose Cooperative
 Nueva Segovia Consortium of Cooperatives (NSCC)
 Nueva Vizcaya Alay Kapwa Multi Purpose Cooperative
 Nueva Vizcaya Multi-Purpose Medical Cooperative
 NutriWealth Multi-Purpose Cooperative
 Office of the Secretary of Justice Employees' Multi-Purpose Cooperative
 OFW Savings and Loans Cooperative
 Old Central Multi-Purpose Cooperative
 Old Sta. Mesa Savings and Credit Cooperative
 Olongapo Multi-purpose Cooperative
 Olongapo Subic Castillejos San MarcelinoTransport Service and Multipurpose Cooperative (OSCSMTSMPC)
 Omaganhan Farmers Multi-purpose Cooperative
 Ormoc Vendors MPC (ORVEMPCO)
 Oro Integrated Cooperative
 Oro Savings & Sharing Cooperative (OSSC)
 Oton Municipal Government Employees Multi-Purpose Cooperative
 Our Lady of Fatima Credit Cooperative
 Our Lady of Grace Credit Cooperative
 Ozamiz City People's Multi-Purpose Cooperative (The People's Bank)
 Paco-Soriano Pandacan Development Cooperative
 Pag-asa Multi-Purpose Cooperative (PMPC)
 Pag-inupdanay Incorporated
 Paglaum Multi-Purpose Cooperative
 Palapag Teachers, Employees & Community Multi-Purpose Cooperative
 Palompon Community Credit Cooperative
 Pamana Credit Cooperative
 Pamilya Kooperatiba Credito de Cebu
 Panabo Multi-Purpose Cooperative
 Panay Agrarian Reform Coop - PARECO (Formerly: Mapili ARB's Multipurpose Cooperative)
 Pandan Multi-Purpose Cooperative
 Pangasinan Savings and Credit Cooperative (PASCOOP)
 Pantok Multi-purpose Cooperative
 Pantukan Chess Club Cooperative (PCC)
 PASAR Employees Multi-Purpose Cooperative
 Pasay Public Market Multi-purpose Cooperative
 Pasig City Employees Multi-Purpose Cooperative
 Passi City Employees Multi-Purpose Cooperative (PACEMCO)
 Patnongon Multipurpose Cooperative
 Pavia Entrepreneurs Multi-Purpose Cooperative
 Payompon Development Cooperative (PADECO)
 PCCCI Cooperative Development Center
 Pecuaria Development Cooperative (PDCi)
 People Like Us Multi-Purpose Cooperative (atin ito tol - luv ko to)
 People's Multi-Purpose Cooperative
 Perlas ng Silangan Multipurpose Cooperative
 Perpetual Help Community Cooperative (PHCCI-Dumaguete City)
 Perpetual Help Credit Cooperative (PHCCI-Tacloban City)
 Pfizer Inc., Credit Cooperative
 PHELARMA Credit Cooperative
 Philex Mines Community Consumers' Cooperative (PMCCCO)
 Philhealth Kapamilya Multi-Purpose Cooperative
 Philippine Air Traffic Controllers' Multi-Purpose Cooperative (PATCOMC)
 Philippine Army Finance Center Producers Integrated Cooperative (PAFCPIC)
 Philippine Court Employees and Retirees Multi-Purpose Cooperative (PCERMPC)
 Pili Market Development Cooperative
 Pinaglabanan Credit Cooperative
 Pingkian Community Development Cooperative, Inc.
 Pintuyan National Vocational School Multipurpose Cooperative (PNVS MPC)
 Pototan Teachers and Employees Multi-Purpose (PTE MPC)
 President Roxas Economic Development Cooperative (PREDCO)
 Productive Work Specialists Multi-Purpose Cooperative (PROWORKS)
 Providers Savings and Credit Cooperative
 Provincial Employees Multi-Purpose Cooperative (PROVIMCO)
 Provincial Union of Negros Occidental-Cooperatives (PUNO)
 PUP Student Credit and Service Cooperative
 Pusuac Multi-Purpose Cooperative
 Quezon Federation of Cooperatives
 Quezon Municipal Employees Credit Cooperative
 Quick and Fast Credit Cooperative (QFCC)
 Red Ribbon Multi-Purpose Cooperative
 Region 08 COMELEC Employees Multi-Purpose Cooperative (RECEMPCO)
 Regional Consular Office Bicol Employees Multi-Purpose Cooperative (RCOBEMPC)
 Reunited Shoemakers Multipurpose Cooperative
 Ridjiki Multi-Purpose Cooperative
 Riverside Medical Center Multi-Purpose Cooperative
 RMC Tuba Arabica Coffee Farmers Cooperative
 Ruralwide Credit Cooperative
 Rustan Employees' Credit Cooperative
 Sacred Heart Credit & Dev't Cooperative
 Sacred Heart Morning Breeze-Balintawak Multi-Purpose Cooperative (SHMBBMPC)
 Sacred Heart Savings Cooperative (formerly Galimuyod Savings and Development Cooperative)
 Sadiri-IA Multipurpose Cooperative (SIAMPUCO)
 Saint Anthony Development Cooperative (SADECO)
 Salvacion Farmers Development Cooperative (SAFADECO)
 Samahan ng kababihan para sa kaunlaran (SANGKAP MPC)
 Samahan sa Ikauunlad ng Pamayanan (SIKAP) Credit Cooperative
 Samahang Ikauunlad ng may Kapansanan Ating Palawakin Multipurpose Cooperative (SIKAP MPC)
 Samahang Magsasaka ng Brgy. Sta. Maria Multipurpose Cooperative (SAMA-SAMA MPC)
 Samal Island Multipurpose Cooperative (SIMC)
 Samar Multipurpose Cooperative (SAMICO)
 Sambahayang Kabalikat ng Bulacan Multi-Purpose Cooperative
 Sambayanang Konsti Credit Cooperative
 Sampaloc Vendors Development Cooperative
 San Dionisio Credit Cooperative (SDCC)
 San Francisco Growth Enhancement Multipurpose Cooperative (SAFRAGEMC)
 San Isidro Development Cooperative
 San Isidro Parish Multi-Purpose Cooperative
 San Joaquin Multi-Purpose Cooperative
 San Jose Water Service & Development Cooperative
 San Jose Workers Multi-purpose Cooperative
 San Juan Multi-Purpose Cooperative (SJMPC)
 San Juan Parish Multipurpose Cooperative
 San Miguel Farmers and Fishers Multipurpose Cooperative
 San Miguel Multipurpose Cooperative
 San Miguel Municipal Employees Cooperative
 San Nicolas Multi-Purpose Cooperative (SNMPC)
 San Pedro de Alcantara Kilusang Bayan sa Pagpapaunlad
 San Ramon Multi-purpose Cooperative (SRMPC)
 San Roque Parish Multipurpose Cooperative
 San Sebastian Multi Purpose Cooperative
 San Vicente Multi-Purpose Cooperative
 SANAP FARMERS MULTI PURPOSE COOPERATIVE
 Sandigan Savings and Credit Cooperative (SASCCO)
 Sanguniang Panglungsod Multi-Purpose Cooperative
 Sarangani Development Cooperative
 Self-Reliant Team Puerto Pincesa Multi-purpose Cooperative (SRT-Puerto Princesa)
 Serbiz Multi-Purpose Cooperative (SMPC)
 Serman Cooperative
 Siaton Small Coconut Farmers Multipurpose Cooperative
 Siayan Farmers Multi-Purpose Cooperative
 Sibonga Multi-Purpose Cooperative
 Simca Model Rice Cluster Multi-Purpose Cooperative (SIMCA MRC MPC)
 Sinonoc National High School Teachers & Employees Multi-Purpose Cooperative (SINAHSTEMCO)
 Sipocot Municipal Employees Cooperative (SIMECO)
 Socorro Empowered Peoples Cooperative (SOEMCO)
 Soro-soro Ibaba Development Cooperative (SIDC)
 Sorsogon Provincial Cooperative Bank (SPCB)
 South Luzon Federation of Cooperatives
 Southern Global Services Multi-Purpose Cooperative (SGSMPC)
 Southern Leyte Employees Multi-Purpose Cooperative (SLEM)
 Southern Leyte State University Credit Cooperative (SLSU-CC)
 Springside (ARB) Irrigators and Farmers Multipurpose Cooperative (SIFAMCO)
 SRT Narra Cooperative of Palawan Multi-Purpose Cooperative (SRT-NARRA)
 SRT Digos Cooperative of Davao del Sur
 St. Catherine's Parish Multi-Purpose Cooperative
 St. John Development Cooperative (SJDC)
 St. Joseph Parish Multi-Purpose Cooperative
 St. Joseph Parish-Kayapa Multipurpose Cooperative
 St. Jude Multi-Purpose Cooperative
 St. Lucy Multi-Purpose Cooperative
 St. Martin of Tours Credit & Development Cooperative (SMTCDC)
 St. Rose of Lima Parish Multi-purpose Cooperative
 St. Vincent de Paul Multi-Purpose Cooperative
 St. Vincent Ferrer Parish Multi-purpose Cooperative
 St. Vincent Parish Credit Cooperative
 St.Jerome's Parish Credit Cooperative
 Sta. Ana Multi-Purpose Cooperative (SAMULCO)
 Sta. Catalina Credit Cooperative (SCC)
 Sta. Catalina Multi-Purpose Agricultural Cooperative (Negros Oriental)
 Sta. Catalina Multi-Purpose Cooperative (Cotabato City)
 Sta. Cruz Multipurpose Cooperative (STA.CRUZ-SARANGANI)
 Sta. Cruz Savings & Development Cooperative (SACDECO)
 Sta. Cruz Savings and Credit Cooperative (SCCC-Bulacan)
 Sta. Monica Credit Cooperative (SMCC)
 Sta. Monica of Pangantucan Multi-Purpose Cooperative
 Sto. Domingo Development Cooperative (SDCC)
 Sto. Nino Meycauayan Savings And Credit Cooperative
 Sts. Peter and Paul Multipurpose Cooperative
 Subic Bay Multi-Purpose Cooperative
 Sugpon Multipurpose Cooperative
 Sugponan Sisa Magsingal Multipurpose Cooperative
 Sugpunan Ti La Union Credit Cooperative
 Sulu Consumers Cooperative
 Suyo Multi-Purpose Cooperative
 Tabok Workers Multi-Purpose Cooperative (Mandaue City)
 Tabuk Multi-Purpose Cooperative (Kalinga)
 Tabuk OFW-Kabayan Cooperative (TAO-KA)
 Tagalog Cooperative Development Center (TAGCODEC)
 Tagbac Multi-Purpose Cooperative
 Tagudin Savings and Credit Cooperative
 Tagum Cooperative
 Talabutab Norte Primary Multi-Purpose Cooperative (TNPMPC)
 Talacogon Agro-Industrial Multi-purpose Development Cooperative (TAMDECO)
 Talisay Primary Multi-Purpose Cooperative
 Talisayon Multi-Purpose Cooperative  (TAMUCO)
 Taloot Rural Waterworks and Sanitation Service Cooperative (TARWASSCO)
 Taloy Norte Farmers Multipurpose Cooperative
 Tam-an Multi-Purpose Cooperative
 Tanay Market Vendors and Community Multi-Purpose Cooperative
 Tanikala ng Pagkakaisa Multi-Purpose Cooperative (TPMCP)
 Tanjay Community Cooperative
 Tao Management Service & Multi Purpose Cooperative
 Tara Agrarian Reform Cooperative (TARC)
 Tayabas Community Multi-Purpose Cooperative
 Teachers Association of Pangasinan Multi-Purpose Cooperative (TAP MPC)
 Texins Multi-Purpose Cooperative
 Thanksgiving Multi Purpose Cooperative
 The Great Provider Multi-purpose Cooperative
 Tibud sa Katibawasan Multi-purpose Cooperative
 Timbermines Multi-Purpose Cooperative (TIMMULCO)
 Tinabangay sa Igsoong Mag-uuma Gasa ni San Isidro Multipurpose Cooperative (TIMGAS)
 TOPply Multi-Purpose Cooperative
 Tubao Credit Cooperative
 Tublasan Water and Sanitation Service Cooperative
 Tumalalud Farmers Multi-Purpose Cooperative (TFMPC)
 Tuy Market Vendors and Community Multi-Purpose Cooperative
 Ubay Water Service Cooperative (UWASCO)
 Ugnayan ng mga Kooperatiba sa Romblon (UKR)
 Ugong Savings & Credit Cooperative
 United Farmers Multi-Purpose Cooperative
 United Primary Multi-Purpose Cooperative
 University of San Carlos (USC) Credit Cooperative
 University of the Philippines School of Economics Employees Multi-Purpose Cooperative
 UPICOB Balikatan Multi-Purpose Cooperative
 Urban People's Development Cooperative
 Uson Small Coconut Farmers Multi-Purpose Cooperative
 Valenzuela Development Cooperative (VALDECO)
 Vibes Multi-Purpose Cooperative
 Victoria Agrarian Reform Cooperative
 Victorias Public School Teachers & Employees MPC
 Virgen Group Allottees, Crew & Employees Cooperative
 Watchlife Workers Multipurpose Cooperative
 Wesley Savings and Credit Cooperative
 West Visayas State University Medical Center Employees Multi-Purpose Cooperative (WVSUMCEMPC)
 Western Philippines University Credit Cooperative (PNAC)
 White Hills Multi-Purpose Cooperative
 Yearnings Outsourcing Cooperative
 Zamboanga Del Norte Federation of Agricultural Cooperative
 Zamboanga Sibugay Credit Cooperative
 Zamboanguita Development Cooperative (ZAMDECO)
 Zamboanguita Small Coconut Farmers MPC
 Zamsurgea Community Multipurpose Cooperative
 Zanorte Credit Community Cooperative

References

External links 
 

Cooperatives in the Philippines